Paulina Bisztyga (born 30 August 1978) is a Polish singer, composer and poet.

Life 
A daughter of Stanisław Bisztyga, politician and economist, and his wife Wiktoria. She graduated artistic high school in Nowy Wiśnicz and Jagiellonian University (history of art).

Her first poems were published in "Gazeta Krakowska" in 1993. In 1995, she published a poetry book titled Nie nazywaj mnie mrokiem. In 1999 during Student Song Festival in Kraków she won second award for the song Nie ma co się bać (There is nothing to be afraid), which was also the title-song for her first solo album (released in 2000).

Currently Bisztyga is co-host (together with Agnieszka Barańska) of programme Nocna kawa (Night coffee), which is broadcast on Radio Kraków.

Discography 
 2000: Nie ma co się bać
 2002: Idź po swoje (a single)
 2007: Proste jest prawo miłości
 2009: Zmiłości

References 

Polish composers
Polish poets
1978 births
Musicians from Kraków
Living people
21st-century Polish singers
21st-century Polish women singers
Polish women composers